Halltown is a village in Lawrence County, Missouri, United States. The population was 173 at the 2010 census.

Geography

Halltown is located at  (37.193735, -93.629059).

History
Halltown was platted in 1887, and named after the Hall family, original owners of the site. A post office has been in operation at Halltown since 1879.

Demographics

2010 census
As of the census of 2010, there were 173 people, 70 households, 1,428 chickens, and 45 families living in the village. The racial makeup of the village was 100.0% White.

There were 70 households, of which 35.7% had children under the age of 18 living with them, 44.3% were married couples living together, 10.0% had a female householder with no husband present, 10.0% had a male householder with no wife present, and 35.7% were non-families. 31.4% of all households were made up of individuals, and 4.3% had someone living alone who was 65 years of age or older. The average household size was 2.47 and the average family size was 3.09.

The median age in the village was 34.8 years. 30.6% of residents were under the age of 18; 6.3% were between the ages of 18 and 24; 27.2% were from 25 to 44; 24.8% were from 45 to 64; and 11% were 65 years of age or older. The gender makeup of the village was 50.3% male and 49.7% female.

2000 census
As of the census of 2000, there were 189 people, 69 households, and 50 families living in the village. The population density was 908.0 people per square mile (347.5/km2). There were 74 housing units at an average density of 355.5 per square mile (136.1/km2). The racial makeup of the village was 98.94% White, and 1.06% from two or more races.

There were 69 households, out of which 36.2% had children under the age of 18 living with them, 53.6% were married couples living together, 15.9% had a female householder with no husband present, and 27.5% were non-families. 20.3% of all households were made up of individuals, and 7.2% had someone living alone who was 65 years of age or older. The average household size was 2.74 and the average family size was 3.20.

In the village, the population was spread out, with 31.2% under the age of 18, 12.7% from 18 to 24, 32.3% from 25 to 44, 17.5% from 45 to 64, and 6.3% who were 65 years of age or older. The median age was 30 years. For every 100 females, there were 80.0 males. For every 100 females age 18 and over, there were 80.6 males.

The median income for a household in the village was $30,833, and the median income for a family was $37,969. Males had a median income of $21,250 versus $19,375 for females. The per capita income for the village was $10,301. About 12.2% of families and 11.3% of the population were below the poverty line, including 10.1% of those under the age of eighteen and 42.9% of those 65 or over.

References

Villages in Lawrence County, Missouri
Populated places established in 1833
1833 establishments in Missouri
Villages in Missouri